The 1950 All-Ireland Junior Hurling Championship was the 29th staging of the All-Ireland Junior Championship since its establishment by the Gaelic Athletic Association in 1912. The championship began on 2 April 1950 and ended on 15 October 1950.

London entered the championship as the defending champions.

The All-Ireland final was played on 15 October 1950 at New Eltham GAA Grounds, between London and Cork, in what was their first meeting in the final since 1947. Cork won the match by 5–05 to 1–04 to claim their sixth championship title overall and a first title since 1947.

Results

Connacht Junior Hurling Championship

Connacht final

Leinster Junior Hurling Championship

Leinster first round

Leinster quarter-finals

Leinster semi-finals

Leinster final

Munster Junior Hurling Championship

Munster first round

Munster semi-finals

Munster final

Ulster Junior Hurling Championship

Ulster first round

Ulster semi-finals

Ulster final

All-Ireland Junior Hurling Championship

All-Ireland semi-finals

All-Ireland home final

All-Ireland final

References

Junior
All-Ireland Junior Hurling Championship